Axiomatic semantics is an approach based on mathematical logic for proving the correctness of computer programs. It is closely related to Hoare logic.

Axiomatic semantics define the meaning of a command in a program by describing its effect on assertions about the program state. The assertions are logical statements—predicates with variables, where the variables define the state of the program.

See also
 Algebraic semantics (computer science) — in terms of algebras
 Denotational semantics  — by translation of the program into another language
 Operational semantics — in terms of the state of the computation
 Formal semantics of programming languages — overview
 Predicate transformer semantics — describes the meaning of a program fragment as the function transforming a postcondition to the precondition needed to establish it.
 Assertion (computing)

References

 
Formal specification languages
Logic in computer science
Programming language semantics